The Adelphi Building is an historic building in Victoria, British Columbia, Canada.  It is located on the northwest corner of Government and Yates Streets.

See also
 List of historic places in Victoria, British Columbia

References

External links

1891 establishments in Canada
Buildings and structures completed in 1891
Buildings and structures in Victoria, British Columbia